Joseph Stuart Clements  (July 14, 1936 – May 4, 2015) was an American football player and coach. As head football coach of at Huntsville High School in Huntsville, Texas from 1975 to 1994, he became the only person to lead a single Texas high school to the state championship as both a player and a coach. He was the starting quarterback for the University of Texas Longhorns from 1955 to 1956. Clements died on Monday, May 4, 2015.

Early life
As a high school quarterback, Clements led Huntsville to the 1953 AA Texas State Championship. With him as quarterback, Huntsville went 28–1 over the 1952–53 seasons. He was a top recruit coming out of high school, and chose to go to Texas, where his father Otto had been a two-time all-Southwest Conference baseball player.

College football
Clements started his sophomore year at Texas as the back-up quarterback to Walter Fondren. But, in the second game of the year, he replaced an ineffective Fondren and had the best game of his career. He threw for 215 yards and three touchdowns in the game, becoming the second Longhorn to ever throw for more than 200 yards in a single game and tying the school record for touchdown passes in a game. Going into the next game, he was the nation's leading passer. He started every game for Texas for the next two years. Against USC the following week, he was knocked out in the first five minutes and replaced by Walter Fondren and third-string quarterback Dick Miller. Texas went on to post a 5–5 record with losses to number 8 USC, number 3 Oklahoma and number 7 TCU, but finished the season on an up-note when they upset rival number 8 Texas A&M. That year, he led the Southwest Conference in interceptions.

Clements remained the starter in 1956 and he led the Southwest Conference in passes completed, completion percentage and interceptions. But the Longhorns had one of the program's worst seasons, going 1–9 for its worst record since 1938. For the rest of the 20th century, they would never fail to win at least four games in a year. With the exception of the first game against USC, when Vince Matthews replaced him after he suffered a concussion, Clements would be the primary quarterback all season. The team's only win was a 7–6 squeaker against Tulane – won by a blocked extra point. Furthermore, the team was shut out twice for the first time since 1938. They were beaten by number 1 Oklahoma in a 45–0 rout and later in the season by TCU, 46–0.

After the 1956 season, Coach Ed Price was fired. Darrell Royal was hired to replace him and Royal replaced the pocket pass-oriented offense that Clements did well in with the split-T option that played more to the strengths of Fondren. Clements fell down the depth chart and as a result only saw limited action in four games during his senior season.

He finished with a 5–13 record as a starting quarterback at Texas.

Records
 UT – Most passes attempted, game (31), surpassed by Rick McIvor in 1981
 UT – Most passes completed, game (17), tied his own record, surpassed by Bret Stafford in 1986
 UT – Most passes had intercepted, season (16), surpassed by Todd Dodge in 1984

Coaching
Clements became a high school football coach and in 1975 became the head coach at his alma mater, Huntsville. During his 19 years in Huntsville, he guided the Hornets to 14 playoff seasons and won the 1980 state title. He finished his 27-year head coaching career with a record of 221–77–6. Among others, Clements was the coach of filmmaker Richard Linklater and was the basis for the football coach in the 1993 movie Dazed and Confused.

He was inducted into the Texas High School Sports Hall of Fame in 2010 for his contributions as a player.

Later life
Clements married a former University of Texas cheerleader and raised three sons, two of whom later played professional football.

Steve was the starting quarterback at Huntsville, where he became Texas's high school player of the year, and the state's all-time leading high school passer, surpassing the record set by Ty Detmer. After originally attending Texas, he transferred to BYU when he was unhappy with his place on the depth chart. He played in the CFL and AFL before becoming a high school football coach.

Chuck went to the University of Houston and later played several years in the NFL.

References

External links
 Texas stats
 

1936 births
2015 deaths
American football quarterbacks
Texas Longhorns football players
High school football coaches in Texas
People from Huntsville, Texas
Players of American football from Texas